Millenbeck is an unincorporated community in Lancaster County in the U.S. state of Virginia.

History
Col. Joseph Matthäus Ball, grandfather of Gen. George Washington, was born in May 1649 in England, settled in Virginia during a period of population growth in the region when the Millenbeck community was in Northumberland County prior to the formation of Lancaster County.

References

Unincorporated communities in Virginia
Unincorporated communities in Lancaster County, Virginia